The Mercedes-Benz Tourismo (formerly designated as the Mercedes-Benz O 350) is an integral coach manufactured by Mercedes-Benz since 1994. It was initially introduced as the successor of low-cost variant presented in year 1992 (O340) to the more luxurious Mercedes-Benz O404 and is produced at Mercedes-Benz bus plant in Hoşdere, Istanbul, Turkey. In 2006 a revised version was launched. By 2014, 21,000 had been sold.

First generation - 1994-2006
As the successor of O340, the O350 was unveiled at Hannover International Motor show in year 1994. Its exterior design is still based on O303, however its chassis no longer comes from O303 like its predecessor, but from O404 instead. This is shown on various new technical features, including disk brakes, independent front suspensions, and the instrument panel.

The exterior design Mercedes-Benz O350 is unusual, either in opposition to its plain predecessor O340 or its flagship O404: A tapered C-pillar makes it unmistakable. At the beginning, O350 is only available as a 12m variant with normal height (known as RHD for Reisehochdecker in German). In year 1998, a variant with increased height was presented, known as O350 SHD (Superhochdecker in German). As a result, the SHD model offers more space for luggage than conventional RHD model. 

In year 1999, the Tourismo series became a facelift. The type designation "O350" was cancelled. The oblique C-pillar is now optically integrated into the front door, which creates a smoother transition of lines. The front, headlamps and exterior mirrors were revised, and fog lights were added. Also the interior was redesigned: Almond-shaped multifunction lights in the ceiling instead of previous light bar. These buses still come from Turkish production, and are available as RHD and SHD models.

Mercedes-Benz Tourismo Edition 10,000
In year 2004, Mercedes-Benz celebrated the 10th anniversary of Tourismo series: Already 10,000 units were produced since its introduction. In the same year, Mercedes-Benz also offered a special edition called "Edition 10,000". It is about a Tourismo RHD with special equipment and many extras, which can be recognized on its chromed stripe around the three-pointed star in the front. A total of 70 units were produced.

Second generation - 2006-2018
The world premiere for the 2nd generation Tourismo took place at IAA in year 2006. It was deliberately intended to be a low-cost alternative of its more luxurious top model, the Travego. At first, it was available in four models: Tourismo (12.14m), Tourismo M/2 (12.96m, with 2 axles), Tourismo M (12.96m, with 3 axles) and Tourismo L (13.93m). There are numerous safety features on this bus: the ESP, ASR, and brake assist (BA). In addition, an alcohol interlock system, tyre pressure monitoring system, and fire extinguishing system in engine compartment are standard. A rear camera is optionally available, which facilitates reverse parking.

In year 2009, as the successor of Integro range, the Tourismo RH with lowered floor was launched. In opposition to Integro, the Tourismo RH have barely optical differences: Only the side window lines in the front section of the vehicle was changed from sharp edges to smoother curves. However, the Tourismo RH model shares most of its technology and equipment options with that of the Tourismo series, and is equipped with the OM470 engine meeting Euro VI standards. The doors are also offered with high panels by default, instead of full-glazed doors, which find application on Integro. According to Daimler, this bus is designed to both meet the requirements of interurban and touring coach uses. Two lengths are available for customers: Tourismo RH (12.14m) and Tourismo RH M (12.98m).

Tourismo K, the compact variant of Tourismo series, was introduced in year 2013. This midi touring coach is 10.32 meters long and offers seats for up to 32 passengers. It has the same height with Tourismo RH series, but its second door is located at the rear, which is advantageous for sufficient underfloor luggage room space. The onboard toilet is also at the rear, just behind the second door. The Tourismo K is equipped with an OM936 Euro VI engine, which delivers 260kW (or 354hp), and shares its equipment options with Tourismo series in general.

Third generation - 2017-present
The 3rd generation Tourismo experienced its world premiere in Brussels in June 2017. There is a major change on its exterior design, which resembles that of Actros, a heavy-duty truck of Mercedes-Benz. Besides that, it received a new interior design and several technological improvements. The options for interior equipment include seats, seat covers, side walls, curtains, luggage carrier shelves and central ceiling panel, which can be customized individually. Additional driving safety is guaranteed by new safety features like Emergency Brake Assist, Stop-Assist (for stop-and-go traffic e.g. traffic jam), Attention Assist, and Front Collision Guard (FCG). 

In comparison to its predecessor, its fuel consumption was reduced by around 4.5% due to more advanced body aerodynamics and lighter, completely redesigned body. With "Efficiency Package", the fuel consumption can even go down by 7%. Some new features such as Predictive Powertrain Control (PPC) or Eco Driver Feedback (EDF), can be equipped on request. Operators can select between 2 cockpit variants: The Basic Plus and the Comfort Plus. They all contain a multifunction steering wheel and a instrument cluster with TFT colour screen, except that the Comfort Plus is additionally fitted with a Coach Multimedia System. 

The 3rd generation Tourismo is available in four models: Tourismo (12.2m), Tourismo M/2 (13.1m, 2 axles), Tourismo M/3 (13.1m, 3 axles) and Tourismo L (13.9m). For the first time, they all are available either as left- or right-hand drive variants. The Tourismo K and RH series remain offered in old design.

The 3rd generation Tourismo replaced 2nd generations of both Tourismo and Travego, as 3rd generation Travego was launched exclusively in Turkey, without direct replacement in rest of the world.

Gallery

References

External links

Mercedes-Benz Tourismo - official website
Mercedes-Benz Tourismo K & RH - official website (web archive)

Tourismo
Vehicles introduced in 1994
Coaches (bus)